Remembrance is a Canadian short film, directed by Stephanie Morgenstern and released in 2001. It was nominated for a Genie Award for Best Live Action Short Film at the 23rd Genie Awards, and won the Jutra Award for Best Short Film at the 4th Jutra Awards. The film set the basis for the TV series X Company Morgenstern and Ellis later created in 2015.

Plot 
Remembrance is an unusual wartime romance, inspired by two true but little-known stories: a man with an extremely rare memory condition, synesthesia, which literally prevented him from forgetting; and Camp X – a top secret training facility near Whitby, Ontario, that was used to train Canadian and Allied spies during World War Two. Against this backdrop, two strangers meet and, each for their own reasons, must struggle against an unexpected and dangerous attraction.

Cast 
 Mark Ellis as Alfred
 Stephanie Morgenstern as Aurora

References

External links 

Canadian drama short films
2001 films
2000s English-language films
2000s Canadian films